The 2004 Polish Film Awards ran on March 6, 2004 in  Warsaw. It was the 6th edition of Polish Film Awards: Eagles.

Awards nominees and winners
Winners are highlighted in boldface.

Best Film
 Zmruż oczy - Arkadiusz Artemjew, Tomasz Gassowski, Andrzej Jakimowski
 Pornografia - Antoine de Clermont-Tonnerre, Lew Rywin
 Żurek

Best Actor
 Zmruż oczy - Zbigniew Zamachowski
 Pogoda na jutro - Jerzy Stuhr
 Pornografia - Krzysztof Majchrzak

Best Actress
 Żurek - Katarzyna Figura
 Przemiany - Maja Ostaszewska
 Zmruż oczy - Ola Prószyńska

Supporting Actor
 Pornografia - Jan Frycz
 Warszawa - Sławomir Orzechowski
 Żurek - Zbigniew Zamachowski

Supporting Actress
 Warszawa - Dominika Ostalowska
 Zmruż oczy - Małgorzata Foremniak
 Żurek - Natalia Rybicka

Film Score
 Pornografia - Zygmunt Konieczny
 Nienasycenie - Leszek Możdżer
 An Ancient Tale: When the Sun Was a God - Krzesimir Dębski

Director
 Zmruż oczy - Andrzej Jakimowski
 Julie Walking Home - Agnieszka Holland
 Pornografia - Jan Jakub Kolski
 Warszawa - Dariusz Gajewski

Screenplay
 Zmruż oczy - Andrzej Jakimowski
 Warszawa - Dariusz Gajewski, Mateusz Bednarkiewicz
 Żurek - Ryszard Brylski

Cinematography
 Pornografia - Krzysztof Ptak
 Julie Walking Home - Jacek Petrycki
 Zmruż oczy - Adam Bajerski, Pawel Smietanka

Costume Design
 An Ancient Tale: When the Sun Was a God - Magdalena Biernawska-Teslawska, Pawel Grabarczyk
 Nienasycenie - Daiva Petrulyte
 Pornografia - Małgorzata Zacharska

Sound
 Pornografia - Jacek Hamela, Bertrand Come, Katarzyna Dzida
 Pogoda na jutro - Nikodem Wolk-Laniewski
 Superprodukcja - Marek Wronko

Editing
 Żurek - Jaroslaw Kaminski
 Pogoda na jutro - Elzbieta Kurkowska
 An Ancient Tale: When the Sun Was a God - Cezary Grzesiuk

Production Design
 Pornografia - Andrzej Przedworski
 An Ancient Tale: When the Sun Was a God - Andrzej Halinski
 Zmruż oczy - Ewa Jakimowska

Special awards

 Life Achievement Award: Kazimierz Kutz

External links
 2004 Polish Film Awards at IMDb

Polish Film Awards ceremonies
Polish Film Awards
Polish Film Awards, 2004